The Vehicle Registration Marks Act 2007 (c 14) is an Act of the Parliament of the United Kingdom.

Section 1 - Retention of registration marks pending transfer
Section 1(1) substitutes new sections 26(1) and (1A) for the existing section 26(1) of the Vehicle Excise and Registration Act 1994.

Section 1(2) amends sections 26(2)(a) and (f) of that Act.

Section 1(3) amends section 62(1) of that Act.

See also
 Halsbury's Statutes

References

External links
The Vehicle Registration Marks Act 2007, as amended from the National Archives.
The Vehicle Registration Marks Act 2007, as originally enacted from the National Archives.
Explanatory notes to the Vehicle Registration Marks Act 2007.

United Kingdom Acts of Parliament 2007